Club Polideportivo Parla Escuela is a Spanish football team based in Parla, in the autonomous community of Madrid. Founded in 1989 it plays in  Royal Madrid Football Federation, holding home games at Estadio Las Américas, with a capacity of 2,000 seats.

Season to season

1 seasons in Tercera División

External links
Official website 

Football clubs in the Community of Madrid
Association football clubs established in 1989
1989 establishments in Spain